Acidipropionibacterium virtanenii is a Gram-positive bacterium from the genus of Acidipropionibacterium which has been isolated from malted barley from Finland.

References 

Propionibacteriales
Bacteria described in 2018